Akmal Vladimirovich Mozgovoy (born 2 April 2000) is a Uzbekistani footballer who plays as a midfielder for Nasaf and Uzbekistan national football team.

Honours
Nasaf
Uzbekistan Cup winners: 2022, 2021 
Uzbekistan Super Cup runner-up: 2022
AFC Cup runner-up: 2021

References

2000 births
Living people
Uzbekistan international footballers
Uzbekistani people of Russian descent
Russian people of Uzbek descent
Association football midfielders
FC Nasaf players
Uzbekistan Super League players
People from Qashqadaryo Region